Jason Martin is a musician from Southern California. He is best known as a member of the indie rock band Starflyer 59, one of the first bands to sign with Tooth & Nail Records.

Martin's style of music has been dubbed "shoegazing", a word used originally in reference to the distorted electric guitar reminiscent of British bands in the late '80s and early '90s. Martin has also been a member of several side project bands, including Bon Voyage, The Pony Express, The Brothers Martin and Neon Horse.

Martin is a Christian and thanks "Our Lord and Savior Jesus Christ" on all his albums. Despite this, very few of his songs have Christian overtones. His music is based more often than not on personal issues such as work, family, friends, and his spirituality.

Jason is the only member of Starflyer 59 who has played on every one of the band's albums. Earlier in his life he played with his brother, Ronnie Martin, in the synthpop based Dance House Children. Jason and Ronnie reunited in the studio in 2006 to record The Brothers Martin, combining both of the current styles from Starflyer 59 and Joy Electric. The CD was released January 23, 2007.

As well as making music and touring, Jason Martin also works for his late father's business as a truck driver.

He released a new shoegaze project Low & Behold (released October 31, 2015) with Ryan Clark of Demon Hunter on Northern Records.

Bands 
 Neon Horse
 Starflyer 59
 Bon Voyage
 The Brothers Martin
 Dance House Children
 Low & Behold
 Lo Tom
 Pony Express
 Red Strat

References

External links 
 Starflyer 59 Official web site
  Bon Voyage

Year of birth missing (living people)
American performers of Christian music
Living people
American Christians
American rock singers
American male singer-songwriters
American rock guitarists
American male guitarists
American rock songwriters
American indie rock musicians
Singer-songwriters from California
Guitarists from California
Neon Horse members
Starflyer 59 members